Emory Speer (September 3, 1848 – December 13, 1918) was a United States representative from Georgia and a United States district judge of the United States District Court for the Southern District of Georgia.

Education and career

Born on September 3, 1848, in Culloden, Monroe County, Georgia, Speer received an Artium Baccalaureus degree in classical studies in 1869 from the University of Georgia and read law. He entered the Confederate States Army in 1864 at the age of sixteen as a volunteer in the Fifth Kentucky Regiment, Lewis brigade, and remained with that command throughout the American Civil War.  He was admitted to the bar and entered private practice in Athens, Georgia from 1869 to 1883. He was Solicitor General for the State of Georgia from 1873 to 1876.

Congressional service

Speer was an unsuccessful candidate for election to the 45th United States Congress to fill the unexpired term of United States Representative Benjamin Harvey Hill. He was elected as an Independent Democrat from Georgia's 9th congressional district to the United States House of Representatives of the 46th and 47th United States Congresses, serving from March 4, 1879, to March 3, 1883. He was an unsuccessful candidate for reelection in 1882.

Later career

Following his departure from Congress, Speer resumed private practice in Atlanta, Georgia from 1883 to 1885. He was the United States Attorney for the Northern District of Georgia from 1883 to 1885.

Federal judge and law dean
Speer was nominated by President Chester A. Arthur on January 19, 1885, to a seat on the United States District Court for the Southern District of Georgia vacated by Judge John Erskine. He was confirmed by the United States Senate on February 18, 1885, and received his commission the same day. His service terminated on December 13, 1918, due to his death in Macon, Georgia. He was the last federal judge in active service to have been appointed by President Arthur. He was interred in Riverside Cemetery in Macon.

During his tenure, Judge Speer heard civil rights cases, and became unpopular in the white community for holding that federal law permitted protection of African Americans.
During his federal judicial service, Speer also served as dean of Mercer University Law School in Macon from 1893 to 1918.

Publications
Removal of Causes from State to United States Courts, 1888.
Lectures on the Constitution of the United States before the law class of Mercer University, J.W. Burke Co., 1897.
Lincoln, Lee, Grant, and other biographical addresses, 1909.

References

Sources
 
 
 History of the University of Georgia, Thomas Walter Reed,  Imprint:  Athens, Georgia : University of Georgia, ca. 1949 pp.878-882
 

1848 births
1918 deaths
University of Georgia alumni
Georgia (U.S. state) lawyers
Georgia (U.S. state) state court judges
Confederate States Army soldiers
People of Georgia (U.S. state) in the American Civil War
Members of the United States House of Representatives from Georgia (U.S. state)
United States Attorneys for the Northern District of Georgia
Judges of the United States District Court for the Southern District of Georgia
United States federal judges appointed by Chester A. Arthur
19th-century American judges
Mercer University faculty
Deans of law schools in the United States
Georgia (U.S. state) Democrats
Georgia (U.S. state) Independents
Independent Democrat members of the United States House of Representatives
19th-century American politicians
United States federal judges admitted to the practice of law by reading law